Ståle Dyrvik (26 October 1943 — 25 November 2022) is a Norwegian historian.

He graduated with the cand.philol. degree from the University of Bergen in 1971. From 1975 to 1988 he worked as an associate professor (førsteamanuensis) at the University of Bergen, and he became a professor there in 1988.

He is a member of the Norwegian Academy of Science and Letters.

Selected bibliography
Norge under eneveldet: 1720-1800, 1976
Den lange fredstiden 1720-1784, 1978, volume 8 of Cappelens Norgeshistorie
Historisk demografi. Ei innføring i metodane, 1983 
Mellom brødre 1780-1830, 1996, volume 7 of Aschehougs Norgeshistorie 
Truede tvillingriker 1648-1720, 1998, volume 3 of Danmark-Norge 1380-1814
Den demografiske overgangen Utsyn & innsikt, 2003
Året 1814 Utsyn & innsikt, 2005

References

External links
University of Bergen
List of publications in FRIDA

1943 births
2022 deaths
20th-century Norwegian historians
University of Bergen alumni
Academic staff of the University of Bergen
Members of the Norwegian Academy of Science and Letters
21st-century Norwegian historians